Marsden may refer to:

Places

Australia
Marsden, Queensland, a suburb in Logan City
Point Marsden, South Australia

Canada
Marsden, Saskatchewan

New Zealand
Marsden (New Zealand electorate)
Marsden Point
Marsden Bay, New Zealand

United Kingdom
Marsden, Tyne and Wear
Marsden, West Yorkshire

United States
Marsden Mounds an archaeological site in Louisiana, USA

Other uses
Marsden (surname)
Marsden motion, a legal motion to replace an incompetent attorney
Marsden High School, in New South Wales, Australia
Marsden State High School, in Queensland, Australia 
Samuel Marsden Collegiate School in Wellington, New Zealand 
Marsden Rattler, otherwise known as the South Shields, Marsden, and Whitburn Colliery Railway

See also
Marden (disambiguation)
Madsen (disambiguation)